Siltasaari (Finnish), or Broholmen (Swedish), is a central neighborhood of Helsinki, Finland. Most of its area is unofficially known also as Hakaniemi.

Kallio